The 1934 Estonian Football Championship was the 14th official football league season in Estonia. Six teams took part in the league five from Tallinn and one from Tartu. Each team played every opponent twice, one at home and once on the road, for total of 10 games. JS Estonia Tallinn won the league for the first time in the club's history. None of the teams were relegated, as the league expanded to eight teams in the next season.

League table

Results

Top scorers

References

Estonian Football Championship
1
Estonia
Estonia